HMS Tartarus was a paddle steamer gunvessel, the name ship of her class, built for the Royal Navy during the 1830s.

Description
The ship's tonnage was 523  tons burthen and she displaced . The Tartarus class was initially armed with a pair of 9-pounder cannon, but these were later exchanged for a single 32-pounder smoothbore cannon on a pivot mount and a pair of 32-pounder carronades. The ships had a crew of 80 officers and ratings.

Construction and career
Tartarus, the third ship of her name to serve in the Royal Navy, was ordered on 2 July 1833, laid down in September 1833 at Pembroke Dockyard, Wales, and launched on 23 June 1834. She was completed on 3 October 1834 at Woolwich Dockyard and commissioned on 27 August of the same year.

Notes

References

1834 ships
Ships built in Pembroke Dock